Liu Yudi (17 September 1923 – 17 February 2015) was a MiG-15 pilot of the People's Liberation Army Air Force of China, and a flying ace during the Korean War, with 6 victories. He later served as commander of the Beijing Military Region Air Force, and was awarded the rank of lieutenant general in 1988.

Biography

Born in Cang County, Hebei on September 17, 1923, Liu Yudi joined the Eighth Route Army in 1938, and he joined the Chinese Communist Party the following year. After graduating from Counter-Japanese Military and Political University in Yan'an, he became a squad leader in the 358th Brigade of 120th Division of Eighth Route Army. During the Second Sino-Japanese War, he participated in the 1940 Hundred Regiments Offensive led by Zhu De and Peng Dehuai in Hebei-Shanxi border. In October 1946 he was accepted to the Northeast People's Liberation Army Aviation School (a predecessor of the PLA Air Force Aviation University) and graduated in September 1948. After graduation, he became a pilot in North China Military District. In June 1950 he joined the newly created PLA Air Force 4th Mixed Brigade, working as a deputy battalion chief. During the Korean War and as a member of the 3rd Fighter Division, he achieved ace status by claiming to have shot down 6 and damaged 2 American aircraft, 4 of which were shot down on a single mission on November 23, 1951 (although US Air Force records did not report any aircraft lost during the engagement).

After the war, he assumed various posts in PLA Air Force, including deputy commander of Beijing Military Region and commander of its Air Force. He was awarded the rank of wing commander in 1955 and the rank of group captain in 1963. He was promoted to lieutenant general in 1988. He was awarded the title of "First Class War Hero of the People's Volunteer Army".

He was a delegate to the 3rd, 4th, 6th and 7th National People's Congress, a delegate to the 11th National Congress of the Chinese Communist Party, and a member of the 7th and 8th National Committee of the Chinese People's Political Consultative Conference (CPPCC). He was also a Standing Committee member of the 7th CPPCC.

Liu retired in April 1990. He died of an illness in Beijing on 17 February 2015. The day before he died, PLA Air Force Commander Ma Xiaotian visited him in the hospital, and Liu wrote down his last words with his quivering hands: "Greatly develop bombers".

Personal life
Liu married Jia Zhaoquan, who was a parachutist in the People's Liberation Army Air Force. The couple had two sons and a daughter. Liu had a granddaughter named Liu Jingjing.

See also

List of Korean War flying aces

References

Sources

1923 births
2015 deaths
Chinese Korean War flying aces
People from Cangzhou
People's Liberation Army Air Force generals
People's Liberation Army generals from Hebei
Delegates to the 7th National People's Congress
Delegates to the 6th National People's Congress
Delegates to the 4th National People's Congress
Delegates to the 3rd National People's Congress
Disputed flying aces
Members of the 8th Chinese People's Political Consultative Conference
Members of the 7th Chinese People's Political Consultative Conference
PLA Air Force Aviation University alumni
Chinese military personnel of World War II